John Troy may refer to:
 John Troy (Australian politician) (born 1941), doctor and member of the Western Australian Legislative Assembly, 1977–1980
 John Troy (bishop) (1739–1823), Roman Catholic Archbishop of Dublin
 John Troy (hurler) (born 1971), Offaly GAA hurler and all-star
 John Weir Troy (1868–1942), American Democratic politician, Governor of Alaska Territory, 1933–1939
 Jack Troy (1927–1995), Australian rugby league player

See also
 John Tory (disambiguation)